António Maria da Silva, GCTE (26 May 1872 in Lisbon – 14 October 1950 in Lisbon) was a Portuguese politician. An engineer, he was a prominent member of the Portuguese Republican Party. He was Prime Minister (President of the Council of Ministers) for four times, during the Portuguese First Republic. After his party victory in the legislative elections of 8 November 1925, he was invited to form government. He led a great campaign against President Manuel Teixeira Gomes, that forced him to resign. He would be the last Prime Minister of the 1st Republic, resigning two days after the 28 May 1926 military movement.

In popular culture
He was caricatured in the very first Portuguese animated film, O Pesadelo de António Maria (1923) by Joaquim Guerreiro.

References 

 
  
  
  

1872 births
1950 deaths
People from Lisbon
Portuguese Republican Party politicians
Democratic Party (Portugal) politicians
Prime Ministers of Portugal
Finance ministers of Portugal
Education ministers of Portugal
Agriculture ministers of Portugal
Government ministers of Portugal
20th-century Portuguese engineers
Recipients of the Order of the Tower and Sword